Brisbane Water Secondary College is a dual-campus government-funded co-educational comprehensive secondary day school, located on the Central Coast of New South Wales, Australia.

Established in 2001, the College catered for approximately 1,500 students in 2018, from Year 7 to Year 12, of whom ten percent identified as Indigenous Australians and ten percent were from a language background other than English. The College is operated by the New South Wales Department of Education; and the College principal is Paul Gilmore.

History 

Brisbane Water Secondary College is a public high school that was created in 2002 by the merging of Umina High School and Woy Woy High School. Both former high schools now constitute the two campuses of the Secondary College. The Umina Campus, located along Veron Road, Umina Beach, caters for Middle School students from Years 7 to 9 and the Woy Woy Campus, located along Edward Street, Woy Woy, caters for Senior School students from Years 10 to 12. The logo of the new school was a Griffin, a mythical hybrid of a lion and an eagle to symbolise the joining of the two schools into one college.

Facilities 

The Umina Campus has a large agriculture farm used for teaching across Years 7 to 12. The Cattle Club has won many awards in agricultural shows with its Limousin steers and with students for judging and parading. The campus has an art space program which offers both experience and knowledge in astrology and further the terrain outside of the atmospheric norms.  

The College also is currently trialling "Sports Academies". The two academies currently being trialled are for Rugby League and Football (Soccer). The rationale for the academies to be in place is to encourage students who have  athletic potential but might otherwise leave school to stay until the end of Year 12. 

From 2009 the senior campus refurbished its Design and Technology faculty to provide vocational courses for students.

From 2011 the Umina Campus has established a dedicated selective Creative and Performing Arts class for years 7 and 8 as part of an ongoing rejuvenation of its CAPA program. The college has continued to enjoy triumphs in the Arts, and is frequently involved in such Arts programs as Central Vision, Schools Spectacular, Starstruck and the Kool Skools recording project, which the campus has won a record four times since its inception.

See also 

 List of government schools in New South Wales
 Education in Australia

References

External links
 Umina Campus website
 Woy Woy Campus website
 NSW Schools website

Educational institutions established in 2001
2001 establishments in Australia
Public high schools in New South Wales
Central Coast (New South Wales)